John Douglas Campbell MacLean (24 March 1929 - November 1987) was a Progressive Conservative party member of the House of Commons of Canada. He was a barrister by career.

After an initial unsuccessful attempt in the 1957 federal election, MacLean was elected at the Winnipeg North Centre riding in the 1958 election. After serving his only term, the 24th Canadian Parliament, MacLean was defeated in the 1962 election.

Prior to his professional career in law and politics, MacLean was a hockey player for the Brandon Wheat Kings, including in the 1949 Memorial Cup, and later a coach and referee for teams in the Manitoba Junior Hockey League.

References

External links
 

1929 births
1987 deaths
Brandon Wheat Kings players
Lawyers in Manitoba
Members of the House of Commons of Canada from Manitoba
Politicians from Winnipeg
Progressive Conservative Party of Canada MPs
20th-century Canadian lawyers